Squash Wales is the national governing body of squash in Wales. It has 121 affiliated clubs and is a member of the World Squash Federation and the European Squash Federation. Squash Wales is responsible for the administration of all aspects of the game including clubs, regional and national leagues, player development and the selection and management of the international squad for competitions, including the European Team Championships and the World Championships. Recent success for the Wales team includes the Bronze medal won in the European Team Championships in Malmö (May 2009), which was the 14th European Team medal won by Wales in all ages since 1997. The Wales team won a world silver medal in 1999.

National competitions organised by Squash Wales include the Welsh Inter-County Challenge Shield and the Welsh Open.

Squash Wales is based at the Sport Wales National Centre, Cardiff, having moved from their office at the St Mellons Country Club, Cardiff on 7 December 2009, their home for the previous 13 years.

In 2012, Squash Wales Limited changed its name to Wales Squash and Racketball Ltd.

In 2017, Wales Squash and Racketball changed its name back to Squash Wales Ltd and rebranded with a new logo.

See also
 Wales men's national squash team

References

External links
 Official site

Sports governing bodies in Wales
Squash in Wales
Organisations based in Cardiff
Wales